The World Rally Championship (abbreviated as WRC) is the highest level of global competition in the motorsport discipline of rallying, owned and governed by the FIA. There are separate championships for drivers, co-drivers, manufacturers and teams. The series currently consists of 13 three to four-day rally events driven on surfaces ranging from gravel and tarmac to snow and ice. Each rally is usually split into 15–25 special stages which are run against the clock on up to 350 kilometres of closed roads. 

Drivers Sébastien Loeb, Sébastien Ogier, Juha Kankkunen, Tommi Mäkinen and Colin McRae all became WRC champions. Other drivers who became well known primarily through their WRC careers include Michèle Mouton, Henri Toivonen, Jari-Matti Latvala and Mikko Hirvonen. Rallies that have frequently appeared in the championship have included Monte Carlo Rally, Tour de Corse, Sanremo, Acropolis, Safari Rally, and national rallies of Great Britain, Finland, New Zealand, Australia and Argentina.

Hyundai, Toyota and M-Sport Ford are the current competing manufacturers. Amongst their leading drivers are Loeb, Ogier, Thierry Neuville, Ott Tänak, Dani Sordo, Elfyn Evans and Kalle Rovanperä.

The WRC also features two support championships, WRC2 and WRC3, which are contested on the same events and stages as the WRC, but with progressively lower performance and running costs of the cars permitted. Junior WRC is also contested on five events of the World Rally Championship calendar.

History

Early

The World Rally Championship was formed from well-known international rallies, nine of which were previously part of the International Championship for Manufacturers (IMC), which was contested from 1970 to 1972. The 1973 World Rally Championship was the inaugural season of the WRC and began with the Monte Carlo Rally on 19 January.

Alpine-Renault won the first manufacturer's world championship with its Alpine A110, after which Lancia took the title three years in a row with the Ferrari V6-powered Lancia Stratos HF, the first car designed and manufactured specifically for rallying. The first drivers' world championship was not awarded until 1979, although 1977 and 1978 seasons included an FIA Cup for Drivers, won by Italy's Sandro Munari and Finland's Markku Alén respectively. Sweden's Björn Waldegård became the first official world champion, edging out Finland's Hannu Mikkola by one point. Fiat took the manufacturers' title with the Fiat 131 Abarth in 1977, 1978 and 1980, Ford with its Escort RS1800 in 1979 and Talbot with its Sunbeam Lotus in 1981. Waldegård was followed by German Walter Röhrl and Finn Ari Vatanen as drivers' world champions.

Group B era

The 1980s saw the rear-wheel-drive Group 2 and the more popular Group 4 cars be replaced by more powerful four-wheel-drive Group B cars. FISA legalized all-wheel-drive in 1979, but most manufacturers believed it was too complex to be successful. However, after Audi started entering Mikkola and the new four-wheel-drive Quattro in rallies for testing purposes with immediate success, other manufacturers started their all-wheel-drive projects. Group B regulations were introduced in the 1982, and with only a few restrictions allowed almost unlimited power. Audi took the manufacturers' title in 1982 and 1984 and drivers' title in 1983 (Mikkola) and 1984 (Stig Blomqvist). Audi's French female driver Michèle Mouton came close to winning the title in 1982, but had to settle for second place after Opel rival Röhrl. The 1985 title seemed set to go to Vatanen and his Peugeot 205 T16 but a bad accident at the Rally Argentina left him to watch compatriot and teammate Timo Salonen take the title instead. Italian Attilio Bettega had an even more severe crash with his Lancia 037 at the Tour de Corse and died instantly.

The 1986 started with impressive performances by Finns Henri Toivonen and Alén in Lancia's new turbo- and supercharged Delta S4, which could reportedly accelerate from 0–60 mph (96 km/h) in 2.3 seconds, on a gravel road. However, the season soon took a dramatic turn. At the Rally Portugal, three spectators were killed and over 30 injured after Joaquim Santos lost control of his Ford RS200. At the Tour de Corse, championship favourite Toivonen and his co-driver Sergio Cresto died in a fireball accident after plunging down a cliff. Only hours after the crash, Jean-Marie Balestre and the FISA decided to freeze the development of the Group B cars and ban them from competing in 1987. More controversy followed when Peugeot's Juha Kankkunen won the title after FIA annulled the results of the San Remo Rally, taking the title from fellow Finn Markku Alén.

Group A era

As the planned Group S was also cancelled, Group A regulations became the standard in the WRC until 1997. A separate Group A championship had been organized as part of the WRC already in 1986, with Sweden's Kenneth Eriksson taking the title with a Volkswagen Golf GTI 16V. Lancia was quickest in adapting to the new regulations and controlled the world rally scene with Lancia Delta HF, winning the manufacturers' title six years in a row from 1987 to 1992 and remains the most successful marque in the history of the WRC. Kankkunen and Miki Biasion both took two drivers' titles with the Lancia Delta HF.
The 1990s then saw the Japanese manufacturers, Toyota, Subaru and Mitsubishi, become title favourites. Spain's Carlos Sainz driving for Toyota Team Europe took the 1990 and 1992 titles with a Toyota Celica GT-Four. Kankkunen moved to Toyota for the 1993 season and won his record fourth title, with Toyota taking its first manufacturers' crown. Frenchman Didier Auriol brought the team further success in 1994, and soon Subaru and Mitsubishi continued the success of the Japanese manufacturer. Scotsman Colin McRae won the drivers' world championship in 1995 and Subaru took the manufacturers' title three years in a row. Finland's Tommi Mäkinen driving a Mitsubishi Lancer Evolution won the drivers' championship four times in a row, from 1996 to 1999. Mitsubishi also won the manufacturers' title in 1998. Another notable car was the Ford Escort RS Cosworth, which was specifically designed for rallying. It was the first production car to produce downforce both at front and rear.

World Rally Car era

For the 1997 World Rally Championship, the World Rally Car regulations were introduced as an intended replacement for Group A (only successive works Mitsubishis still conforming to the latter formula; until they, too, homologated a Lancer Evolution WRC from the 2001 San Remo Rally). After the success of Mäkinen and the Japanese manufacturers, France's Peugeot made a very successful return to the World Rally Championship. Finn Marcus Grönholm took the drivers' title in his first full year in the series and Peugeot won the manufacturers' crown. England's Richard Burns won the 2001 title with a Subaru Impreza WRC, but Grönholm and Peugeot took back both titles in the 2002. 2003 saw Norway's Petter Solberg become drivers' champion for Subaru and Citroën continue the success of the French manufacturers. Citroën's Sébastien Loeb went on to control the following seasons with his Citroën Xsara WRC. Citroën took the manufacturers' title three times in a row and Loeb surpassed Mäkinen's record of four consecutive drivers' titles, earning his ninth consecutive championship in 2012. Suzuki and Subaru pulled out of the WRC at the end of the 2008 championship, both citing the economic downturn then affecting the automotive industry for their withdrawal. Mini and Ford both pulled out of the WRC at the end of the 2012 championship, due to a similar economic downturn affecting the European market, although Ford continued to give technical support to M-Sport. Volkswagen Motorsport entered the championship in 2013 and Sebastien Ogier dominated the series with six consecutive titles. Hyundai also returned to the series in 2014. New World Rally Car rules were introduced for 2017 which generated faster and more aggressive cars.

In 2018, Toyota Gazoo Racing WRT won the World Rally Championship earning Toyota their first manufacturers' title since 1999. With Tommi Mäkinen heading the team, he became the first person in the history of rally driving to win a Championship both as a driver and as a team principal. At the end of the following year, Citroën withdrew from the championship after Ogier left the team. Ott Tänak took the driver's title breaking the French Sebastien's (Loeb and Ogier) domination of the sport since 2004. Hyundai meanwhile, took the manufacturers championship title and repeated the success in 2020. Ogier returned to championship winning ways for 2020 and 2021 in a Toyota Yaris, though vowed that the new era of Rally1 would not be fully contested by himself. WRC said goodbye to the World Rally Car in 2021 after 25 years.

The championships 

Any crew entering any WRC rally are eligible to score points in the overall World Rally Championships for Drivers and Co-Drivers. This is regardless of car technical class, number of rallies entered or if they are also entered into the support championships.

Manufacturers must register to be eligible to score in the World Rally Championship for Manufacturers and must compete in Group Rally1 specification cars (World Rally Car between 1997 and 2021). As the manufacturers use the highest performance car and usually employ the best drivers it is usually the case that these crews and cars take the majority of drivers/co-drivers championship points. Thus, combined with the money invested by the manufacturer teams, promotion of the WRC only tends to include the manufacturer crews and privateers in the Rally1 car or World Rally Car. These crews are given Priority 1 (P1) status on rallies and contest the stages before other crews. However it is not unusual for competitors in lower performance cars to take points in the drivers or co-driver's championships.

The World Rally Championship for Teams is for non-manufacturing entities. They can only enter in Rally1 or World Rally Cars if the corresponding manufacturer team is also running in the manufacturers' championship.

Support championships 
The World Rally Championship also features support championships called WRC2 and WRC3. These championships are contested on the same events and stages as the WRC calendar and have tighter restrictions on eligible car criteria.

WRC2 

WRC2 is contested using only Rally2 cars with championships for drivers, co-drivers and teams. Drivers and co-drivers can enter a maximum of 7 events and their best 6 results will count towards their championship tally. Teams must enter two cars into a maximum of 7 events, only 5 of 6 events entered in Europe will score, with points from a 7th rally entered outside Europe also scoring points towards the championship tally. Power stage points are also awarded. Drivers, co-drivers and teams must all nominate if they wish to be eligible for championship points before a rally and can do so independently. For that reason the same crew pair in the same team may compete in all events in a season yet nominate and score points in different events. Crews competing in WRC2 are given Priority 2 status and run the stages immediately after P1 crews. WRC2 replaced SWRC when Group R was introduced in 2013 and the eligibility rules relaxed.

In 2023, WRC2 Challenger Driver and Co-Driver Championships will run for WRC2 drivers who have not won the series before, or who have not driven for a manufacturer entry in the previous 5 years.

WRC3 

WRC3 is contested using only Group Rally3 cars (Group Rally2 in 2020 and 2021), with championships for drivers and co-drivers. Designed for privateer drivers, WRC3 has lower entry costs than WRC2 and there are restrictions on who can enter, testing and professional support received. Drivers and co-drivers can enter up to 5 rallies with their best 4 scoring championship points, and scoring rounds must also be nominated beforehand. Crews competing in WRC3 are given Priority 3 status to run after the WRC2 crews.

Junior WRC 

Junior WRC is an arrive-and-drive format championship run over 5 events of the WRC calendar using Ford Fiesta Rally3 cars provided by M-Sport. Drivers have to be under 29 and must register. Championship titles are awarded to drivers and co-drivers, though there is no age restriction for co-drivers.

The Junior World Rally Championship was previously an open championship for younger drivers in S1600 cars from 2001. In 2011 it became a closed FIA sanctioned championship run by either M-Sport or Citroën in the current format. Ford Fiesta R2/Rally4 or Citroën DS3 R3 cars were provided, maintained and serviced for each entrant. Championships were awarded to drivers, co-drivers and nations. Only 5 rounds of the WRC calendar were competed with the best 4 results counting towards championship points, although the final round was worth double points. The highest scoring driver from each country registered points for the nations championship. Uniquely for this series, points were also awarded for stage wins.

WRC Masters Cup 
In 2023 the FIA WRC Masters Cup will run for the first time. The cup is open to drivers and co-drivers over 50 years of age and may enter in any WRC eligible car except Rally1. The cup effectively replaces WRC2 Masters Cup which ran in 2022 for WRC2 entrants of the same criteria.

Discontinued support championships 

The WRC Academy was an alternative name for J-WRC between 2011 and 2012, the first years the championship became a one-make series before reverting to the JWRC name.

The World Rally Championship Ladies Cup ran from 1990 to 1995 and could be won by any class of car. Louise Aitken-Walker was the first winner.

The Production car World Rally Championship (P-WRC) began in 1987 as the FIA Group N Cup before being renamed in 2002. Cars in the championship were production-based and homologated under Group N rules. From 2013, the Production WRC was renamed WRC3 including Group R cars with two-wheel drive (R3, R2 and R1).

The 2-Litre World Rally Cup ran from 1993 to 1999 using front wheel drive cars with engine capacities up to 2000cc. With relaxed rules the cars could often outpace the Group A and World Rally Cars of the main category. The series was abandoned due to high costs and the Super 2000 and Super 1600 specification cars that the series inspired later became the origins for SWRC and JWRC.

The Super 2000 World Rally Championship (S-WRC) was started in 2010 using Super 2000 category cars. There were competitions for drivers (known as the S-WRC) and another for teams (the World Rally Championship Cup). From 2013, WRC2 replaced S-WRC and including cars with four-wheel drive (R5, R4 and S2000).

The WRC Trophy was run in 2017 for privateers entering with older World Rally Cars when the new WRC+ was introduced.

WRC 2 Pro ran only in 2019 and was open to manufacturer-supported teams entering cars complying with Group R5 regulations. It was replaced in 2020 with the Rally2 based WRC3.

One-make series tournaments have also run on select rounds of the WRC calendar. They were privately administered rally tournaments but permitted to run on the rallies alongside the WRC. Examples include the Ford Fiesta Sporting Trophy (2006, 2007 and 2009) and DMACK Fiesta Trophy (2014–2016), both ran by M-Sport, and Citroën Top Driver (2013) ran by Citroën. Neither team held these tournaments in the years they had the rights to manage the JWRC on the FIA's behalf.

Format and structure

Calendar 

Each WRC season consists of a number of rounds within the same calendar year and should ordinarily include rallies on a minimum of 3 continents. In the past the championship has visited every continent except Antarctica. Most recently there have been about 13 rallies though there have been as few as 7 such as in 2020 due to COVID-19 pandemic. The rallies are typically driven on surfaces ranging from gravel and tarmac to snow and ice.

Rallies 

The competitive special stages are driven on closed roads which are linked by non-competitive road sections known as liaisons. These roads are open to the public and all road laws of that country must be adhered to. The liaison routes are detailed in a road book given to each crew and must also be adhered to within a specified time limit to arrive at the next stage or time control point or else they face penalties. To help organise this, crews carry a timecard which is filled in at each time control or special stage by an official.

Any stage which deviates from the character of the rally or ordinary running of a special stage is known as a super special stage. These are often short and for spectators or promotional purposes and may be on a different surface such as asphalt on a gravel character rally, or they may be a head-to-head running where two cars start at the same time at different points in a loop format.

Since 2021 rallies must consist of only one surface type except where short super special stages are permitted that do not require a change in the car's setup. In the past some rallies such as Sanremo or Rally Spain have had one day of gravel followed by another day of asphalt stages, requiring substantial changes in the setup of the car. Asphalt setups have 18" wheels compared to 13" on gravel or snow, combined with changes needed to the differentials, suspension travel and geometry. Historically, multiple brands have provided tyres to competitors, though in recent years Pirelli have become a control tyre for all four wheel drive cars in the championship. They offer different tyres for dry and wet asphalt, gravel, snow and ice with studs or no studs, with different compound hardness also available. Hand cutting a tread pattern is not permitted.

A WRC event begins with reconnaissance (recce) on Tuesday and Wednesday, allowing crews to drive through the stages and create or update their pace notes. On Thursday, teams can run through the shakedown stage to practice and test their set-ups. The competition typically begins on either Thursday evening or Friday morning and ends on Sunday with the Power Stage. Cars start the stages at two-minute intervals in clear weather, or three-minute intervals if it is decided that visibility may be a problem for competitors. 

Each rally has one central service park where the cars are prepared and repaired if needed at the end of each loop and leg, however some rallies may organise a remote service and/or tyre fitting zone nearer to the stages during a leg. How much time can be spent working on the car once the rally has started is outlined in the rally's itinerary. Between the days, after a final end of day service, cars are locked away in parc fermé, a quarantine environment where teams are not permitted to access or work on their cars.

Championship points 
Points are awarded and contribute towards the world championships, and those with the most points at the end of the season are given the championship title. Points can be awarded derived from the overall final classification or from the Power Stage (below). The driver's championship and manufacturer's championship are separate but based on a similar point system. This means a driver can win the driver's championship driving one car yet a different manufacturer can win the manufacturer's championship which has occurred on several occasions, most recently in 2018, 2019 and 2020.

Points are awarded at the end of each rally to the top ten overall finishers under the following points structure for drivers and co-drivers:

Manufacturers must nominate up to three crews to be eligible for manufacturer championship points before an event. The two fastest nominated crews from each manufacturer form a new classification for the purpose of awarding manufacturer points in the same structure as above. Retired crews cannot score points and it is not unusual for a crew to finish way down the overall order, possibly after restarting, yet still score manufacturers points.

Power Stage

First introduced in 2011, the "Power Stage" is the final stage of the rally and is typically televised live and immediately followed by the rally's podium celebrations. Additional World Championship points are available to the five fastest drivers and co-drivers through the stage regardless of where they actually finish in the rally. The fastest team receiving five points, the second-fastest receiving four points, etc. and the fifth-fastest receiving one. In 2021 manufacturers began scoring power stage points following a similar system to the classification points, where only the top two nominated from each team can be eligible. Ordinary Special Stages are timed with an accuracy to the tenth of a second, the "Power Stage" timing is to the thousandth of a second.

Restarting after retirement
Crews are permitted to restart the following day if they are forced to retire. For each stage not completed however, a ten-minute penalty plus the winning stage time in the same priority group is added to the overall time. Originally known as SuperRally when introduced and later renamed Rally 2, the rules allow for a better return on investment for competitors and more action for spectators. The Rally 2 name was dropped in 2019 as restarting became the norm, indeed crews are expected and assumed to be restarting unless they register a permanent retirement with the clerk of the course. The name was also dropped to avoid confusion with the new Rally2 group of car. Restarting is still at the discretion of the organisers, such as meeting safety standards after a heavy accident.

Cars

The rules surrounding which cars are used in WRC are governed and approved by the FIA. From the WRC's inception, cars had always followed a basic rule of being Category I, 'Series Production Cars' with a minimum production requirement to achieve homologation by the FIA. This ceased to be the case when Group Rally1 cars were introduced for the 2022 season. Rally1 regulations placed them in Category II as 'Competition Cars', which are built as single examples for exclusive use in competition.

The rules have changed over time to suit economic conditions, for safety reasons, to advance technology, to attract more manufacturer entrants or to better promote the series. Specifications of cars used can be for just one type, such as the World Rally Car, or a Group of similar specifications that differ in performance such as Group R. In 2014, the FIA introduced the current sporting classes to help further categorise the different classes and groups based on performance. RC1 has the highest performance cars whilst RC5 has the lowest permitted at WRC level.

To enter a WRC rally in 2022, cars must be homologated in one of the following groups or classes: World Rally Car 1.6L, any of the Groups Rally and R3 or R-GT of Group R

World Rally Car 1.6L 

Eligible cars with 1.6L direct injection turbo engines and four-wheel drive built to World Rally Car regulations. The 'WRC+' cars including the Ford Fiesta WRC, Toyota Yaris WRC and the Hyundai i20 Coupe WRC cannot be driven by those who had scored manufacturer points between 2017 and 2021. Earlier WRC cars since 2011, such as the Volkswagen Polo R WRC are permitted without such restrictions. 2021 was the final season of this specification at the top of the sport, being replaced by Rally1 in the manufacturer's championship in 2022.

Groups Rally

The Groups Rally consists of six rally car specifications eligible for WRC.
Rally1 cars were introduced in 2022 and replaced the World Rally Car as the car permitted in the manufacturer's championship. Hybrid powertrains were introduced for the first time in rallying amongst cost-cutting initiatives such as centrally developed tubular safety structures and simpler suspension and transmissions.
Rally2 cars, formerly R5 of Group R, are the second highest performance cars and are the sole cars eligible for WRC-2.
Rally2-Kit cars, previously known as R4-kit in Group R, are also eligible for overall entry. Rally2 and Rally2-Kit are within the same sporting category — RC2.
Rally3 cars were introduced in 2021 and used in WRC3 from 2022.
Rally4 cars, formerly R2 of Group R, do not have a specific support championship.
Rally5 cars, formerly R1 of Group R, do not have a specific support championship.

Group R 

Starting in 2008, a category of rally cars known as Group R were introduced as a rally only replacement to the Group A and Group N categories which were slowly phased out of eligibility. Cars were classified under one of six categories based on their engine capacity and type, wheelbase, and drivetrain. Group R cars still had to be homologated in Group A or N but have the relevant Group R extension approved in common with other rally formulae. As a result, older cars could reclassify under Group R subject to meeting criteria.

With R5, R4, R2 and R1 of Group R being renamed and absorbed by the new Groups Rally, as of the 2021 season R3 and R-GT cars are still currently eligible for overall entry. R3 cars however have been downgraded to RC4 sporting class from RC3, in line with Rally4 cars rather than superseding them. Neither R3 or R-GT have specific WRC support championships.

Historically eligible cars 

When the WRC began in 1973, FISA allowed cars from its Group 1 (series-production touring cars), Group 2 (touring cars), Group 3 (series-production grand touring cars) and Group 4 (modified grand touring cars) amongst national classes. These FISA classes were also used in circuit racing and other motorsport championships. The groups formed the basis of new groups in 1982, Group N replaced Group 1, Group A replaced Group 2, and Group B replaced Group 4. Due to the increasing power, lack of reliability and a series of fatal accidents during the 1986 season, Group B was permanently banned. In 1987 Group A became the highest performance car and the choice for manufacturers whilst privateers opted for the budget friendly Group N for use in the newly created Production Car World Rally Championship. A Group N car has won a WRC rally only once - a Renault 5 driven by Alain Oreille won the Rallye Côte d'Ivoire in 1989. Despite the PWRC ending in 2012, Group N cars were allowed to enter WRC2 until 2016 and overall rallies until the end of 2018.

In 1997, the World Rally Car specification was introduced to ease the development of new cars and bring new makes to the competition. An extension of Group A, the WRC cars were used in the manufacturer's championship, although Mitsubishi received special dispensation to run their Group A models into 1999, and won three drivers and one manufacturers championships whilst doing so. In 2011 changes were made to the World Rally Car, the engine capacity was restricted to 1.6L and the minimum length requirement removed to allow for smaller and cost-effective models. Further changes in 2017 allowed for more aero-dynamics, increased safety requirements and a larger air intake restrictor, which increased the effective power from 300 to 380 hp.

Super 2000 cars were allowed to enter the overall rallies from 2007 to 2018. They were eligible in the PWRC from 2007 to 2009 before the Super 2000 World Rally Championship was run between 2010 and 2012. They were also accepted in WRC2 from 2013 to 2016. 
Super 1600 cars were only allowed to enter in JWRC and on events that the championship was held on up to 2010 before the R2 became the sole championship car.

Promotion and coverage 

WRC Promoter GmbH owns the commercial rights to the WRC championships, responsible for all media coverage, sponsorship operations and encouraging of participants. WRC Promoter GmbH is jointly owned by Red Bull Media House and KW25 Beteiligungs GmbH. Through the Red Bull Content Pool, WRC provides news, articles and images for professional news and media outlets free of charge. The WRC.com website and mobile apps provides news, live rally times and results, championship standings and information about the rallies and championships. 

Commercial rights to the championship were first sold in 1996 to International Sportsworld Communicators (ISC), a company owned by Bernie Ecclestone who also held an FIA presidential position at the time. ISC was sold in 2000 to a group led by the then Subaru team boss David Richards, who later sold the company to North One Television in 2007. In 2009, ISC was awarded a 10-year contract to act as the first promoter for the championship from 2010. This new relationship included the FIA handing over responsibilities such as proposing new events and recruiting new sponsors. The contract with North One Sports (renamed from ISC) was cancelled by the FIA ahead of the 2012 season after the company entered into administration the previous year. The current promoter, WRC Promoter GmbH, was announced as the new promoter from the 2013 season.

Internet video

Video coverage is provided in various forms at WRC.com, mobile or smart TV apps. Brief highlights, clips on technology and documentary videos are free to watch, whilst a paid-for subscription is required to watch premium content via WRC+. This service features the same highlights and review videos as produced for TV, as well as onboard footage, live map tracking, and since 2018 WRC+ All Live, live coverage and commentary from every stage during each rally event.

Brief and free video footage is also provided via social media platforms. In addition, the first running of Shakedown is often shown live on YouTube and Facebook though is not shown via WRC+.

Red Bull also produce feature-length programmes for Red Bull TV using stage footage from WRC TV combined with their own presenting team and insight from guest pundits. Dirtfish.com also provide some video content in a similar way, though usually not as long.

WRC TV

WRC TV produces previews, daily highlights and event reviews for each rally, as well as other magazine shows such as season reviews for broadcast television. Some TV stations also broadcast the power stage and select other stages live, usually two stages on a Saturday and the first run of what will be the power stage. Further, TV stations may broadcast the entire All Live live stream, typically via an interactive channel.

The make up and format for these programmes can vary from country to country depending on the local broadcaster and prominence of local drivers. In 2016, the cumulative worldwide TV audience for WRC TV's programmes was more than 700 million, growing to 836 million in 2019. The programming is available in over 150 markets and more than 12,000 hours were screened globally in 2016, reducing to under 10,000 hours in 2019.

Radio
Live radio/audio coverage of the rallies was provided in English by a free service called World Rally Radio, broadcast via the Internet by Crown House Media. The service featured end of stage reports direct from the drivers and teams, up to date results and stage times plus other news in the service park. It also produced podcasts and featured contemporary music during breaks in rally coverage. World Rally Radio ceased in 2018 when WRC+ All Live began.

Podcasts 
An official podcast is frequently produced. The latest version Backstories has interviewed drivers and co-drivers since 2020.

Records and statistics

Manufacturers 

21 different manufacturers have won a World Rally Championship event: Citroën, Ford, Lancia, Toyota, Peugeot, Subaru, Volkswagen, Mitsubishi, Audi, Fiat, Hyundai, Datsun/Nissan, Opel, Renault, Renault-Alpine, Saab, Mazda, BMW, Mercedes-Benz, Porsche and Talbot. With a further 11 having finished on the podium: Seat, Mini, Vauxhall, Alfa Romeo, Volvo, Ferrari, MG, Polski Fiat, Škoda, Triumph and Wartburg. Lancia, with ten Manufacturers' Championships, has won more championships than any other marque.

Champions

Championships by driver's country 
Updated after the 2022 season.

Event wins 

Updated after 2023 Rally Mexico. Drivers and manufacturers who have participated in the 2023 World Rally Championship are in bold.

Video games and esports

There have been many video games based on the World Rally Championship, and due to lack of licenses, many more based on only certain cars, drivers or events. Sega Rally, released in 1995, as well as V-Rally and Top Gear Rally in 1997 were primarily 'arcade' racing games with little emphasis on realistic damage or physics. The Colin McRae Rally series introduced in 1998 was the first to incorporate a more realistic 'simulation' feel to the genre. Rally Trophy, released in 2001 for Microsoft Windows by Bugbear, concentrated on historic cars such as Alpine A110 and Lancia Stratos. RalliSport Challenge, released in 2002 for Windows and Xbox by Digital Illusions CE, featured classic Group B cars and hillclimb models along with modern WRC cars.

The first fully FIA licensed WRC: World Rally Championship was released in 2001 for PlayStation 2 by Evolution Studios. The video game series had its fifth game, WRC: Rally Evolved, in 2005. Racing simulator Richard Burns Rally, released in 2004 for several platforms, has gathered recognition for its realism. Recent top-selling games include Colin McRae: DiRT 2, Sega Rally Revo and Dirt 3. Gran Turismo 5 includes WRC licensed cars from manufacturers such as Subaru and Ford. In October 2010, Black Bean Games released WRC: FIA World Rally Championship which features the cars, drivers and events of the 2010 World Rally Championship, including those from the three support categories. A downloadable patch was produced allowing players to drive in Group B cars such as the Audi Quattro. Various cars whose participated in the WRC such as Mitsubishi Lancer WRC and Ford Fiesta RS WRC have also appeared in the Facebook game Car Town. The WRC video game license was acquired by French game development studio Kylotonn from Milestone srl after the release of WRC 4: FIA World Rally Championship in 2013. The first WRC game by Kylotonn was WRC 5, released in 2015, with successive releases on a near-annual basis with WRC Generations due in 2022. The WRC license will pass to Codemasters for the period of 2023 to 2027.

eSports WRC is an online championship run via the latest official video game. Beginning in 2016, the championship is free and open to anybody with a copy of the game. Each esports season ends with a Grand Finale with competitors gathering for an on-site event to race each other, usually in the service park of an actual rally event. Previous eSports WRC champion Jon Armstrong is also a physical rally driver, and racehouse Williams run a team.

Footnotes

References

External links

  
 Rally database at eWRC-results.com

 
Recurring sporting events established in 1973
Rally racing series
World auto racing series